Ellen Louise Elzerman (born 22 January 1971 in Bussum, North Holland) is a former backstroke and freestyle swimmer from the Netherlands, who competed for her native country at the 1992 Summer Olympics in Barcelona, Spain. There she was eliminated in the heats of the 100 m and 200 m backstroke. In the 4×100 m medley relay she finished in eighth position with the Dutch Team, after gaining the bronze medal in the same event one year earlier at the European Championships in Athens, Greece.

References
 Dutch Olympic Committee

1971 births
Living people
Olympic swimmers of the Netherlands
Dutch female freestyle swimmers
Dutch female backstroke swimmers
Swimmers at the 1992 Summer Olympics
People from Bussum
European Aquatics Championships medalists in swimming
Sportspeople from North Holland
20th-century Dutch women